The men's K-1 1000 metres event was an individual kayaking event conducted as part of the Canoeing at the 1972 Summer Olympics program.

Medalists

Results

Heats
The 24 competitors first raced in three heats on September 5. The top three finishers from each of the heats advanced directly to the semifinals. One competitor was disqualified. All remaining competitors competed in the repechages the next day.

Chilingrov's reason for disqualification was not disclosed in the official report.

Repechages
Taking place on September 7, three repechages were held. The top three finishers in each repechages advanced to the semifinals.

Semifinals
Raced on September 8, the top three finishers from each of the three semifinals advanced to the final.

Final
The final took place on September 9.

References
1972 Summer Olympics official report Volume 3. p. 488. 
Sports-reference.com 1972 K-1 1000 m results.

Men's K-1 1000
Men's events at the 1972 Summer Olympics